Cowboy Christmas III is the twenty-fifth album by American singer-songwriter Michael Martin Murphey and his third album of Christmas music. The album features traditional music and poetry performed by Michael Martin Murphy and cowgirl poet, Sarah Rische. Also included is a new Michael Martin Murphey song "The Kill Pen". All the poems were recited by Michael Martin Murphey except "Are You Going Home for Christmas", which was recited by Sarah Rische.

Track list
 "Are You Going Home for Christmas?" (Edgar Guest) – 2:17
 "The Old Times Christmas" (Bruce Kiskaddon) – 2:47
 "Draggin' in the Christmas Tree" (Doc Mayer) – 4:27 
 "The Kill Pen" (Michael Martin Murphey, Karen Murphey) – 3:49
 "Doc's Morning Star Ranch Christmas Trilogy" (Doc Mayer) – 3:44 
 "The Cowboy's Christmas Prayer" (S. Omar Barker) – 3:34
 "The Night Before Cowboy Christmas" (Michael Martin Murphey) – 3:24
 "Riding the River Styx" (Doc Mayer) – 10:37

Credits 
Music
 Michael Martin Murphey – vocals
 Sarah Rische – vocals
 Ryan Murphey – guitar
 John McEuen – guitar
 Bea McTye – pipe organ
 Joey Miskulin – accordion
 Paul Sadler – backing tracks

Production
 Reggie Smith – producer
 Michael Martin Murphey – producer
 Alana Richstone – graphic design
 Jerry Riness – cover painting and back photo

References
 Notes

 Citations

External links
 Michael Martin Murphey's Official Website

2002 albums
2002 Christmas albums
Christmas albums by American artists
Country Christmas albums
Michael Martin Murphey albums
Sequel albums